Uranium City is a northern settlement in Saskatchewan, Canada. For census purposes, it is located within the province's Division No. 18 territory.

History 
In 1949, athabascaite was discovered by S. Kaiman while he was researching radioactive materials around Lake Athabasca near Uranium City.

In 1952, the provincial government decided to establish a community to service the mines in the Beaverlodge uranium area developed by Eldorado Mining and Refining, a federal crown corporation. In 1954, the local newspaper, The Uranium Times, noted that 52 mines were operating and 12 open-pit mines were next to Beaverlodge Lake. Initially, most of the residences in Uranium City were simply tents.

Some of the mines operating in the area included the Gunnar Mine, the Lorado Mine, and the Fay-Ace-Verna Mine in Eldorado, Saskatchewan.

Two options were considered for communities in the region: small communities near the mine site or larger more centralized communities with adequate services. Not wanting to replicate some of the problems associated with small mining towns at the time in Northern Ontario, the government pushed for the second option and modelled Uranium City after the community of Arvida, Quebec. In 1956, the provincial government passed the Municipal Corporation of Uranium City and District Act, creating a unique, chartered "district" with authority over education, health, and welfare.

The population of Uranium City started to grow significantly only once Eldorado Resources made a deliberate initiative in 1960 to see staff housed in Uranium City instead of the Eldorado campsite.

After reaching a population of 2,507 in 1981, the closure of the mines in 1982 led to economic collapse, with most residents of the community leaving. The Uranium City Act was repealed on 1 October 1983, reducing the community to an unincorporated "northern settlement". The local hospital closed in the spring of 2003. Its population in 2016 was 73, including a number of Métis and First Nations people.

Demographics 

Transportation 
The community has a certified airport, Uranium City Airport, that features a treated gravel runway of  operated by the Saskatchewan Ministry of Highways and Infrastructure. The airport is one of the few employers left in the community. West Wind Aviation previously served Uranium City with flights to Prince Albert and Saskatoon three times a week. Norcanair served the community with scheduled flights until it ceased operations in 2005. Transwest Air also provided a route with Saskatoon and Regina until that company cancelled its service in November 2008. It now serves Uranium City with a flight from Saskatoon that stops in Prince Albert, Points North and Stony Rapids. There is also a small water aerodrome located next to Uranium City.

There is no normal road access connecting Uranium City with the rest of Canada. There is provision for a winter road which connects with Fond-du-Lac. Saskatchewan Highway 962 provides travel for a short distance within the local area. A significant bridge replacement project on Highway 962 was conducted in 2001 at the Fredette River.

Communications 

Local telephone service is provided by SaskTel and was first available in Uranium City on 30 November 1955. Current telephone numbers for international calling are of the form +1 306 498 xxxx (NPA-NXX: 306–498, CLLI: URCYSK05DS0).

Canada Post continues to deliver mail to the community. The post office is located at the municipal office (Postal Code: S0J 2W0).

Radio broadcasting in the community is provided by:
 97.9 FM – VF2142 – rebroadcasts CKRW-FM
 99.9 or 101.1 FM – Missinipi Broadcasting Corporation
 103.1 FM – VF2240 – rebroadcasts CFMI-FM
 105.1 FM – CBDH-FM, CBC Radio One, rebroadcasting CBKA-FM La Ronge.

Until 2012, television service was provided by CBKAT operating on channel 8 at a power of 15 watts. This was a rebroadcast of CBC Television service from CBKST Saskatoon. Until 2003, the local transmitter's television programming originated from CBC North. This repeater was one of 620 analog television signals nationwide shut down by the CBC on 31 July 2012 due to budget cuts.

Climate 
Uranium City is part of the Taiga Shield Ecozone and experiences a subarctic climate (Köppen Dfc) with long, cold, snowy winters, brief transitional periods, and short, cool, and humid summers. The temperature range is typically large due to frigidly cold winter temperatures that often plunge below . Wind chill factors are prominent as well in the winter months, making the cold temperatures seem to be much colder than they actually are. Uranium City has recorded one of the coldest wind chill factors of any Canadian location, with  wind chill reading being recorded on 28 January 2002. Additionally, an average of 34 days a year record wind chill readings below .

Education 
Education in Uranium City is under the authority of the Northern Lights School Division #113, a school district that covers most of northern Saskatchewan. The only remaining school in Uranium City is Ben McIntyre School, serving classes from kindergarten to Grade 9. The school opened in 1977 and is named after the first teacher in Uranium City who established the first school in the community in 1952 with 40 students in ten grades. As of September 2005, 10 students were enrolled.

Secondary education was provided by CANDU High School, named after a nuclear reactor. According to travellers Vincent Chan and Tricia Holopina who visited the city in 2002, locals state that the school was opened in 1979 and closed in 1983 after only three years of service, with the building since sustaining extensive vandalism.

Notable people 
The following people are associated with Uranium City by birth, residence or career:
 Bert Burry, pilot and ice hockey player
 Gina Kingsbury, member of gold medal-winning Canadian women's ice hockey team at the 2006 Winter Olympics
 Gilbert LaBine, a founder of the Gunnar Mine

See also 

 List of communities in Northern Saskatchewan
 List of communities in Saskatchewan
 List of uranium projects
 Athabasca System Hydroelectric Stations
 Jeffrey City, Wyoming

References 

 
Designated places in Saskatchewan
Division No. 18, Unorganized, Saskatchewan
Mining communities in Saskatchewan
Northern settlements in Saskatchewan
Road-inaccessible communities of Saskatchewan
Lake Athabasca